Hyagnis is a genus of beetles in the family Cerambycidae, containing the following species:

 Hyagnis aethiopicus Breuning, 1974
 Hyagnis apicatus Holzschuh, 1984
 Hyagnis basicristatus Breuning, 1949
 Hyagnis bimaculatus Hüdepohl, 1995
 Hyagnis bootangensis Breuning, 1969
 Hyagnis brevipes Breuning, 1939
 Hyagnis chinensis Breuning, 1961
 Hyagnis fistularius Pascoe, 1864
 Hyagnis gabonicus Breuning, 1939
 Hyagnis indicus Breuning, 1969
 Hyagnis insularis Báguena & Breuning, 1958
 Hyagnis kashmirensis Breuning, 1939
 Hyagnis meridionalis Breuning, 1969
 Hyagnis pakistanus Breuning, 1975
 Hyagnis persimilis Breuning, 1939
 Hyagnis spinipes Breuning, 1962
 Hyagnis stramentosus Breuning, 1942
 Hyagnis strandiellus Breuning, 1942
 Hyagnis sumatrensis Breuning, 1982
 Hyagnis sybroides Breuning, 1939
 Hyagnis vagemaculatus Breuning, 1938

References

 
Cerambycidae genera